Abraham Hanson (1818 - 1866) was an English-born American pastor and US diplomat.

Personal life 
Hanson was born near Bromley in South Yorkshire and was educated at Bromley College. He moved to the United States to become a pastor in the Methodist Episcopal Church pastor, serving in parishes in Aurora, Illinois, Chicago, Milwaukee and Racine, Wisconsin. He left the ministry in 1851 due to poor health and relocated to Kenosha, Wisconsin, where he became involved in local politics and was elected city treasurer for several terms.

Professional career 
In May 1862, he became a U.S. Commercial Agent in Liberia and in June 1863, he was appointed by President Abraham Lincoln to become the first U. S. Commissioner/Consul General to Liberia. The United States Senate confirmed the appointment on January 12, 1864. In 1866, Hanson became ill during his diplomatic service. He died on July 20, 1866, and was buried  in Monrovia, the Liberian capital.

References

 Abraham Hanson papers, 1840-1866, David M. Rubenstein Rare Book & Manuscript Library, Duke University
 "History of First Methodist Episcopal Church, Racine, Wisconsin" (1912), pages 53 and 70; published by E. W. Leach in 1912. Page 70 and 53.

1818 births
1866 deaths
American Methodists
19th-century Methodist ministers
Ambassadors of the United States to Liberia
19th-century American diplomats
City and town treasurers in the United States
Members of the Methodist Episcopal Church